Natalia Hussey-Burdick is an American politician and activist, who was elected to succeed Patrick Branco as State Representative for District 50 in the Hawaii House of Representatives during the state's 2022 General Election.

Education and early career
Hussey-Burdick graduated from the University of Hawaiʻi in 2016 with a B.A. in biology. She initially made plans to attend Medical School while working as a court-appointed Guardian Ad Litem in the Hawaii foster care system.

Before becoming a candidate for public office herself, Hussey-Burdick worked a legislative aid for Hawaii State Senator Laura Thielen and a Committee Clerk for the House Committee on Veterans and Military Affairs.

Political career
In 2018, Hussey-Burdick launched her campaign to represent Hawaii's 49th House of Representatives District, entering a four-way primary election. She later lost the primary election, coming in second place with about 19 percent of the vote, paving the way for Scot Matayoshi to win the General election uncontested.

After her 2018 loss, she served as Chief-of-Staff to State Representative Tina Wildberger. In 2021, she was also confirmed as a member of the State Council Reapportionment Commission, which was responsible for Hawaii's redistricting process following the 2020 census. She also served as Secretary of the Hawaii Democratic Party from 2018 to 2020.

In 2022, Hussey-Burdick ran in Hawaii's 50th House District race to succeed Patrick Branco, who did not run for reelection to the state house in order to run for Congress in the 2022 midterm elections. Hussey-Burdick won a four-way primary election with less than 42 per cent of the vote She then went on to easily win the primary election against local political and businessowner Kathy Thurston with almost 60 per cent of the vote.

Electoral history

References

1989 births
Living people
21st-century American politicians
Democratic Party members of the Hawaii House of Representatives
University of Hawaiʻi at Mānoa alumni
Activists from Hawaii